Kim Ji-hoon (born January 17, 1987, Goyang City) is a South Korean super featherweight/lightweight boxer.

Boxing career 
"Volcano" Kim Ji-hoon began his boxing career in October 2004 in South Korea, winning eight of his first 12 fights. In July 2006, he fought his first match abroad at the International Conference Hall in Nagoya, Aichi, Japan, where he lost to Makyo Sugita by unanimous decision after 10 rounds.

In May 2008, he fought his first United States match in Las Vegas, Nevada, where he defeated Georgian born Koba Gogoladze by technical knockout in the first round. Kim survived a series of punishing blows from his opponent before knocking him down with a devastating left hook, ultimately finishing the match with a flurry of punches moments later. In March 2009, he fought his second U.S. fight in Laredo, Texas, defeating Gilbert Salinas by TKO in the eighth round.

On February 12, 2010, Kim fought national amateur champion Tyrone Harris as part of the Friday Night Fights main event. Kim won by TKO in the fifth round after the referee stopped the fight.

On May 21, 2010, Kim fought Ameth Diaz as part of the Friday Night Fights main event. Kim defeated Diaz by TKO in the first round at 2:59.

Kim lost his first fight in four years on August 15, 2010, to Miguel Vazquez for the vacant IBF Lightweight title by unanimous decision.

References

External links
 
 Article from Banner Promotions.com

|-

International Boxing Organization champions
1987 births
Living people
People from Goyang
Sportspeople from Gyeonggi Province
South Korean male boxers
Welterweight boxers